Guttulamia aurigutta is a species of beetle in the family Cerambycidae, and the only species in the genus Guttulamia. It was described by Karl Jordan in 1903.

References

Lamiini
Beetles described in 1903